The .460 Steyr (11.6×90mm Grillmayer) is a center fire cartridge from the weapons manufacturer Steyr Mannlicher, which was developed for sniper rifles. During the development, important features for the military, such as the penetration power of armor or a tracer, were not taken into account. The cartridge was presented for the first time in February 2004 at the ShotShow-2004 in Las Vegas together with the Steyr HS .50.

The cartridge was designed by Horst Grillmayer in 2002, while the projectile was designed by Guido Wasser. Production started around 2004 together with the Steyr HS .460.
The ammunition was developed for precision rifles for sport shooters, with the focus on the long range and bypassing the 12.7 × 99 mm NATO (.50 BMG) caliber, the use of which is prohibited in many European countries for non-official purposes. The ammunition can also be of interest to armies deployed abroad, which have been banned from using 12.7 mm ammunition in peacekeeping operations.

Overview
The external shape of the .460 Steyr cartridge is very similar to cartridges in the 12.7 × 99 mm caliber, but has a shorter case and a narrower cartridge neck, which leads to increased gas pressure. The ballistic properties of the .460 Steyr and the 12.7 × 99 mm are largely similar.

The ammunition is also comparable to other special cartridges such as the .408 Chey Tac or the .416 Barrett, which were also developed as special calibers for precision rifles in order to be able to work over long distances.

See also
List of rifle cartridges
.50 BMG
.416 Barrett
.408 CheyTac

References

External links
Official C.I.P. Datasheet and Specifications
.460 Steyr History - Cartridge Collector

Steyr Mannlicher
Pistol and rifle cartridges
Weapons and ammunition introduced in 2004
11.6x90mm